Oscar Luis Colas Leon (born September 17, 1998) is a Cuban professional baseball outfielder in the Chicago White Sox organization. He played for the Fukuoka SoftBank Hawks of Nippon Professional Baseball from 2017 to 2019.

Career

Cuban and Japanese career
In 2016–2017 season, Colas played in the Santiago de Cuba of the Cuban National Series.

On May 10, 2017, the Government of Cuba signed a contract to dispatch Colas and Liván Moinelo to the Fukuoka SoftBank Hawks as a developmental player.

From mid-2017 season to mid-2019 season, he played in informal matches against Shikoku Island League Plus's teams and amateur baseball teams, and played in the Western League of NPB's minor leagues.

On June 24, 2019, Colas signed a 15 million yen contract (~US$140,000) with the Fukuoka SoftBank Hawks as a registered player under control. On August 18, he debuted against the Saitama Seibu Lions, and recorded a home run at the first Plate appearance in the Pacific League. In 2019 season, he played 7 games in the Pacific League.

On January 3, 2020, Francys Romero of MLB.com reported that Colas has defected from Cuba and is looking to sign on with a Major League team. On December 23, 2020, Colas was officially granted his release and declared a free agent by Major League Baseball. He was made eligible to sign with a club starting in January 2021.

Chicago White Sox
On January 25, 2022, Colas signed with the Chicago White Sox. His bonus was worth $2.7 million. Soon after, Colas gave up pitching to focus on outfield work.

References

External links

NPB.jp
46 Oscar Colas PLAYERS2020 - Fukuoka SoftBank Hawks Official site

1998 births
Living people
Avispas de Santiago de Cuba players
Cuban expatriate baseball players in Japan
Defecting Cuban baseball players
Fukuoka SoftBank Hawks players
Nippon Professional Baseball outfielders
Nippon Professional Baseball pitchers
People from Santiago de Cuba Province
Winston-Salem Dash players
Birmingham Barons players